Nocardioides sediminis is a Gram-positive, aerobic and short-rod-shaped bacterium from the genus Nocardioides which has been isolated from sediments from Bigeum Island, Korea.

References

External links
Type strain of Nocardioides sediminis at BacDive -  the Bacterial Diversity Metadatabase	

sediminis
Bacteria described in 2009